Emelec can refer to:

Empresa Eléctrica del Ecuador, a former Ecuadorian electric company
Club Sport Emelec, an association football club founded by the above company